Joseph Gatt (born 3 December 1971) is an English actor. He is best known for his roles in the films Thor (2011), Star Trek Into Darkness (2013), and Dumbo (2019).

Early life
Gatt was born in the Notting Hill area of London on 3 December 1971, the son of Maltese immigrant parents; his father is from Paola and his mother is from Lija. While growing up, he spent summers with his family in Malta. As a teenager, he discovered that he was colour blind, which prevented him from fulfilling his dream of joining the Royal Air Force and becoming a fighter pilot. He has theorised that the stress of this news was also the possible trigger for his alopecia universalis, with which he was diagnosed at the age of 12, and he had lost all of his hair by the age of 14. He trained as an actor at the Sylvia Young Theatre School before joining the Mountview Academy of Theatre Arts, where he graduated with a bachelor's degree.

Accusations of sex crimes
On April 6, 2022, Gatt was arrested by the LAPD for allegedly having sexually explicit chats with a minor online.

The arrest came after the LAPD served him a search warrant and searched his Beverly Grove home. The search and subsequent arrest was made possible as the result of a felony warrant following the initial investigation by the LA Internet Crimes Against Children (ICAC) Task Force.

He was released the same day on $5,000 bail.

Career
After graduating from drama school, Gatt's first film role was in Orpheus & Eurydice, playing opposite Oliver Reed in one of Reed's last films. He has performed in many musicals in London's West End and in national tours.

Personal life
Gatt lives in Los Angeles with Mercy Malick, his girlfriend, since around 2009.

Filmography

Film

Television

Video games

References

External links
 Official website
 
 

1971 births
Living people
20th-century English male actors
21st-century English male actors
Alumni of the Mountview Academy of Theatre Arts
British expatriate male actors in the United States
British people of Maltese descent
English expatriates in the United States
English male film actors
English male models
English male television actors
English male video game actors
English male voice actors
English people of Maltese descent
Male actors from London
Male motion capture actors
People from Notting Hill
People with alopecia universalis